Events from the 1270s in the Kingdom of Scotland.

Monarchs 

 Alexander III, 1249–1286

Events

Births 

 11 July 1274 –  Robert the Bruce (died 1329)
Full date unknown
 c. 1270 – William Wallace (died 1305 in England)
 c. 1272 – Isabel Bruce (died 1358 in Norway)
 c. 1274 – John Comyn III of Badenoch (died 1306)
 c. 1275 – John de Menteith (died c. 1329)
 c. 1276 – Maurice de Moravia, Earl of Strathearn (died 1346)
 c. 1278 – Christina Bruce (died c. 1356)

Deaths 

 26 February 1275 – Margaret of England, Queen of Scots (born 1240 in England)
 28 May 1279 – William Wishart
Full date unknown
 c. 1271 – Colban, Earl of Fife
 c. 1272 – David de Graham
 1274 – William I, Earl of Ross
 c. 1274/1277 – John Comyn I of Badenoch (born c. 1215)
 c. 1278 – Walter de Moray

See also 

 List of years in Scotland
 Timeline of Scottish history

References 

1270s